Chlamydastis chionoptila is a moth of the family Depressariidae. It is found in Brazil.

The wingspan is about 19 mm. The forewings are white thinly speckled dark fuscous and with the markings fuscous suffusedly irrorated black. There is a strigula from the costa near the base, and a small dot beneath it. There are spots on the costa at one-fourth, the middle, and three-fourths, the first small, sending a somewhat curved series of small greyish indistinct spots below the middle to near the dorsum at two-fifths, the second scarcely larger, the third moderately large, from behind the second discal white ridge-tuft a rather broad fasciate streak of suffusion running to the dorsum before the tornus and uniting in the disc with a slightly curved shade from the third costal spot. There is also a curved interrupted subterminal shade and a marginal series of dots around the apex and termen. The hindwings are grey.

References

Moths described in 1926
Chlamydastis